Fort Bliss is a United States Army post in New Mexico and Texas, with its headquarters in El Paso, Texas. The portion of the post located in El Paso County, Texas, is a census-designated place with a population of 8,591 as of the time of the 2010 census. Fort Bliss provides the largest contiguous tract of restricted airspace in the Continental United States, used for missile and artillery training and testing, and at 992,000 acres boasts the largest maneuver area (ahead of the National Training Center, which has 642,000 acres). The garrison's land area is accounted at 1.12 million acres, ranging to the boundaries of the Lincoln National Forest and White Sands Missile Range in New Mexico.

Units 
Fort Bliss is home to the 1st Armored Division, which returned to US soil in 2011 after 40 years in Germany. The division is supported by the 1st Armored Division Sustainment Brigade. The installation is also home to Joint Task Force North (JTF), a joint service command. JTF North supports federal law enforcement agencies in the conduct of counterdrug/counter transnational organized crime operations; it facilitates DoD training in the United States Northern Command (USNORTHCOM) area of responsibility, to disrupt transnational criminal organizations and deter their freedom of action in order to protect the homeland and increase DoD unit readiness. The 32nd Army Air and Missile Defense Command (AAMDC) is a theater level Army air and missile defense multi component organization with a worldwide, 72 hour deployment mission. It is the Army Forces Command and Joint Force Land Component Commanders' (ARFOR / JFLCC) organization that performs critical theater air and missile defense planning, integration, coordination, and execution functions. The Joint Modernization Command (JMC) plans, prepares, and executes Joint Warfighting Assessments and other concept and capability assessments, provides objective analysis and feasible recommendations to enhance Multi Domain Command and Control and inform Army Modernization decisions. On order, JMC conducts directed assessments in support of the Cross Functional Teams of Army Futures Command.

1st Armored Division 
1st Armored Division units include: 1st Brigade Combat Team, 1st Armored Division ("Ready First") is prepared to deploy, conduct decisive and sustainable land operations in support of a division, Joint Task Force, or Multinational Force. The Brigade will be trained and ready to conduct decisive action as part of Combined Arms Maneuver or Wide Area Security operations IOT disrupt or destroy enemy military forces, control land, and be prepared to conduct combat operations to protect U.S. national interests.

2nd Brigade Combat Team, 1st Armored Division ("Strike") is prepared to deploy, conduct decisive and sustainable land operations in support of a division, Joint Task Force, or Multinational Force. The Brigade will be trained and ready to conduct decisive action as part of Combined Arms Maneuver or Wide Area Security operations IOT disrupt or destroy enemy military forces, control land, and be prepared to conduct combat operations to protect U.S. national interests.

3rd Brigade Combat Team, 1st Armored Division ("Bulldog") is prepared to deploy, conduct decisive and sustainable land operations in support of a division, Joint Task Force, or Multinational Force. The Brigade will be trained and ready to conduct decisive action as part of Combined Arms Maneuver or Wide Area Security operations IOT disrupt or destroy enemy military forces, control land, and be prepared to conduct combat operations to protect U.S. national interests.

1st Armored Division Combat Aviation Brigade ("Iron Eagles") conducts aviation operations to support geographic combatant commanders conducting unified land operations.

1st Armored Division Artillery ("Iron Steel") provides direct support, precision strike, and Joint Fires capability to the 1st Armored Division for Unified Land Operations in support of the Division's contingency operations. 1AD DIVARTY provides trained and ready fire support forces and assists BCT Commanders in training their fire support systems.

1st Armored Division Sustainment ("Muleskinners") provides mission command of assigned, attached, and OPCON Echelons above Brigade sustainment units and synchronize distribution and sustainment operations in support of 1st Armored Division, and other aligned units. On order, rapidly deploy to designated contingency areas; receive, integrate, and provide mission command of sustainment units providing operational and tactical sustainment; and perform theater opening, theater distribution, and sustainment operations in support of Unified Land Operations.

Additional units/agencies 

The NCO Leadership Center of Excellence (NCOL CoE): Acknowledged as the world's premiere accredited academic institution for noncommissioned officers aligned under Army University and the Combined Arms Command, with additional reporting to Training and Doctrine Command. Provides professional military education to DoD and allied noncommissioned officers to
meet the challenges of an increasingly complex world while developing disciplined, fit, and well educated leaders

The United States Army Sergeants Major Academy (USASMA) was accredited as a branch campus of the Command and General Staff College (CGSC) in 2018. CGSC Combined Arms Center Execution Order, dated 21 March 2018, made USASMA the 4th campus of CGSC. On 21 June 2019 USASMA Class 69 became the first students from the Sergeants Major Course to earn Bachelors of Arts in Leadership and Workforce Development (Staff College) through USASMA. The accreditation process took 10 years, beginning with the last officer commandant, Col. Donald E. Gentry.

The 11th Air Defense Artillery Brigade: Known as the "Imperial" Brigade, it strategically deploys combat ready units globally in support of the 32nd AAMDC to conduct joint and combined air and missile defense operations in order to protect the Combatant Commander's critical priorities. O/O, conducts reset and training of Patriot, Avenger Iron Dome, and Terminal High Altitude Area Defense (THAAD) units.

William Beaumont Army Medical Center (WBAMC): WBAMC delivers quality healthcare to Soldiers and beneficiaries at Fort Bliss to sustain a Ready Force; every encounter, every day.

The 5th Armored Brigade: The brigade plans, coordinates, synchronizes, and supports the pre/post mobilization training and demobilization of Army National Guard and United States Army Reserve units in order to provide trained and ready forces for worldwide contingencies. On order, deploys exportable OC/T teams in support of the Army Total Force Policy.

The Fort Bliss Mobilization Brigade: The brigade provides all administrative and logistical aspects of Title 10 support to mobilizing/demobilizing units. Act as focal point for installation support and quality of life issues. Coordinate requirements and integrate mobilization support. Provides personnel and logistical readiness validation input.

The CONUS Replacement Center: CRC receives, processes, equips, and conducts Theater Specific Individual Requirements Training (TSIRT) for military Non Unit Related Personnel (NRP), Department of Defense (DoD) Civilians, and Non Logistics Civil Augmentation Program (Non LOGCAP) Contactors deploying to and redeploying from theaters of operations in support of overseas contingency operations.

The Army Field Support Battalion (AFSBn): AFSBn is a critical element in the transformation of Army logistics, providing a "single face to the field," to the Army's finest warfighters. Responsible for enhancing the readiness of Active, Reserve and National Guard units and continuously synchronizing the distribution of sustainment materiel and force projection at the Installation and field level in order to support the Materiel Enterprise and combat readiness of supported units and contingency operations.

The Network Enterprise Command: This unit defends the security of the Army Global Network Construct, provides transparent delivery of Command, Control, Communications and Computer (C4) Information Technology (IT services to customers).

The Civilian Personnel Advisory Center (CPAC) -- Desert Mountain: CPAC is responsible for assisting customers in recruiting, developing and sustaining a professional civilian workforce through effective, efficient, and responsive human resource products and advisory services.

The headquarters for the El Paso Intelligence Center (EPIC), a federal tactical operational intelligence center, is hosted at Fort Bliss. Its DoD (United States Department of Defense) counterpart, Joint Task Force North, is at Biggs Army Airfield. Biggs Field, a military airport located at Fort Bliss, is designated a military power projection platform.

Fort Bliss National Cemetery is located on the post. Other forts in the frontier fort system were Forts Griffin, Concho, Belknap, Chadbourne, Stockton, Davis, Richardson, McKavett, Clark, McIntosh, Inge, and Phantom Hill in Texas, and Fort Sill in Oklahoma. There were "sub posts or intermediate stations" including Bothwick's Station on Salt Creek between Fort Richardson and Fort Belknap, Camp Wichita near Buffalo Springs between Fort Richardson and Red River Station, and Mountain Pass between Fort Concho and Fort Griffin.

Infrastructure
 DoD's second largest installation at 1.12M acres; abuts the largest, White Sands Missile Range
 Maneuver acreage (heavy and light): 924,640.2 acres
 Only Digital Air Ground Integration Range (DAGIR) built to full Army specifications
 Longest runway in the Army, 8th in DoD
 Major trauma center (plus the new WBAMC)
 One of the largest single solar residential community in the continental US (4K+ homes) with potential to expand
 Total building gross square footage (GSF) (less housing): 24,499,406 SF; 2,139 total buildings

History

Early locations

Post opposite El Paso del Norte (1849–1854)

In 1846, Colonel Alexander Doniphan led 1st Regiment of Missouri mounted volunteers through El Paso del Norte, with victories at the Battle of El Brazito and the Battle of the Sacramento. Then on 7 November 1848, War Department General Order no. 58 ordered the establishment of a post across from El Paso del Norte (now Ciudad Juárez). On 8 September 1849, the garrison party of several companies of the 3rd U.S. Infantry ('The Old Guard', currently the oldest active duty regiment in the US Army), commanded by Major Jefferson Van Horne, found only four small and scattered settlements on the north side of the Rio Grande. The Post Opposite El Paso del Norte was first established at the site of Coon's Ranch (often erroneously referred to as Smith's Ranch, now downtown El Paso) and, along with Fort Selden and other Southwestern outposts, protected recently won territory from harassing Apaches and Comanches, provided law and order, and escorted the forty-niners. Van Horne also had nominal command of the Post at San Elizario, the former Presidio of San Elizario, seventeen miles downstream from El Paso del Norte. With constant Indian raids, garrisons had to be moved frequently to meet the shifting threats.

Post of El Paso (1854), Fort Bliss, (1854–1868) 
On 11 January 1854, Companies B, E, I and K of the 8th Infantry, under the command of Lt. Col. Edmund B. Alexander, established Post of El Paso at Magoffinsville under orders from Secretary of War Jefferson Davis. The post was named 'Fort Bliss' on 8 March 1854 in honor of Lt. Col. William Wallace Smith Bliss, a veteran of the Mexican War (1846-1848) who was cited for gallantry in action.

There it remained for the next 14 years, serving as a base for troops guarding the area against Apache attacks. Until 1861 most of these troops were units of the 8th Infantry Regiment. At the outbreak of the American Civil War, David E. Twiggs, the Commander of the Department of Texas, ordered the garrison to surrender Fort Bliss to the Confederacy, which Col. Isaac Van Duzen Reeve did on 31 March 1861. (Companies B, E, F, H, I, and K were captured by the Confederacy and remained prisoners of war until 25 Feb 1863 in Texas, with Company A returning safely to the North with their Colors on 26 May 1861.) Confederate forces consisting of the 2nd Regiment of Texas, under the command of Col. John R. Baylor, took the post on 1 July 1861, and used it as a platform to launch attacks into New Mexico and Arizona in an effort to force the Union garrisons still in these states to surrender. Initially the Confederate Army had success in their attempts to gain control of New Mexico, but following the Battle of Glorieta Pass, the Confederate soldiers were forced to retreat when their supply lines were cut. The Confederate garrison abandoned Fort Bliss without a fight the next year when a Federal column of 2,350 men under the command of Colonel James H. Carleton advanced from California. The Californians maintained an irregular garrison at Fort Bliss until 1865, when 5th Infantry units arrived to reestablish the post; these were subsequently relieved by the 25th Infantry, Buffalo Soldiers, on 12 August 1866, followed by the 35th Infantry two months later.

Camp Concordia (1868–1876)
After May 1867 Rio Grande flooding seriously damaged the Magoffinsville post, Fort Bliss was moved to a site called 'Camp Concordia' in March 1868. Camp Concordia's location was immediately south of what is now Interstate 10, across from Concordia Cemetery in El Paso. The Rio Grande was about a mile south of the camp at that time; water was hauled daily by mule team to the camp. On 11 March 1869 the old name of Fort Bliss was resumed. Water, heating, and sanitation facilities were at a minimum in the adobe buildings of the fort; records reveal that troops suffered severely from dysentery and malaria and that supplies arrived irregularly over the Santa Fe Trail by wagon train. The Concordia post was abandoned in January 1877, and after troops left in January, El Paso was without a garrison for more than a year. By that time, the town and its environs on the north side of the river had swelled to a population of almost 800.

Hart's Mill (1878–1893) 

On New Year's Day,1878, Fort Bliss was established as a permanent post; the Company L Buffalo Soldiers of the Ninth Cavalry and Company C of the 15th Infantry, were sent to Fort Bliss to prevent further trouble over the salt beds and the usage of Rio Grande water for irrigation purposes. Prior to this date, the government had had a policy of simply leasing property for its military installations. With a $40,000 appropriation, a building program was begun. The first railroad arrived in 1881, and tracks were laid across the military reservation, thereby solving the supply problems for the fort and the rapidly growing town of El Paso. Although no money was appropriated for the land, $8,250 was easily raised by the local residents, who realized the economic benefit to the area.

Present site (1893–today) 
The present site of Fort Bliss on La Noria mesa, was laid out by Captain John Ruhlen from 1891 to 1892 and was first occupied by four companies of the 18th Infantry in October 1893.

Pershing expedition

In January 1914, John J. Pershing arrived in El Paso to take command of the Army 8th Brigade that was stationed at Fort Bliss. At the time, the Mexican Revolution was underway in Mexico, and the 8th Brigade had been assigned the task of securing the Mexico–United States border. In March 1915, under the command of General Frederick Funston, Pershing led the 8th Brigade on the failed 1916–1917 Punitive Expedition into Mexico in search of outlaw Pancho Villa.

On Friday, 11 March 2016, members of the 2nd Squadron, 13th Cavalry Regiment, (3rd BCT, 1st Armored Division, Fort Bliss) conducted a staff ride at Pancho Villa State Park, NM, the former site of Camp Furlong, 2nd Squadron's billet in 1915. They reviewed the terrain of the 9 March 1916 raid by Pancho Villa's forces on the unit 100 years before. 2nd Squadron then participated in a parade with reenactors, and Roll Call of the fallen.

During this time, the military airfield in El Paso would become one of the homes to the United States Army Border Air Patrol and the 1st Aero Squadron, the U.S. Army's first tactical unit equipped with airplanes.

World War I and postwar
As American Expeditionary Forces (AEF) commander (1917–1918), John J. Pershing transferred to Fort Bliss and was responsible for the organization, training, and supply of an inexperienced force that eventually grew from 27,000 men to over 2,000,000—the National Army of World War I.

From 10 December 1917 – 12 May 1918, the wartime 15th Cavalry Division existed at Fort Bliss. Similarly, the Headquarters, 2nd Cavalry Brigade was initially activated at Fort Bliss on 10 December 1917 and then deactivated in July 1919, but then reactivated at Fort Bliss on 31 August 1920. Predominantly a cavalry post since 1912, Fort Bliss acquired three light armored cars, eight medium armored cars, two motorcycles, and two trucks on 8 November 1928.

World War II and postwar
During World War II, Fort Bliss focused on training anti-aircraft artillery battalions (AAA). In September 1940 the Coast Artillery's anti-aircraft training center was established, and in 1941 the 1st Tow Target Squadron arrived to fly target drones (the 6th, 19th, and 27th Tow Target Squadrons were at the nearby Biggs Field). On 3 August 1944, the Anti-Aircraft Artillery School was ordered from Camp Davis to Fort Bliss to make the training of anti-aircraft gunners easier, and they became the dominant force at Fort Bliss following the departure of the U.S. 1st Cavalry Division. On 15 September 1942, the War Dept. made space available for handling up to 1,350 POWs, while POW camps could be constructed. During the war, the base was used to hold approximately 91 German and Italian Americans and Japanese from Hawaii (then a territory), who were arrested as potential fifth columnists but, in most cases, denied due process.

By February 1946, over 100 Operation Paperclip German scientists and engineers had arrived to develop rockets and were attached to the Office of the Chief of Ordnance Corps, Research and Development Service, Suboffice (Rocket), headed by Major James P. Hamill. Although these men were initially "pretty much kept on ice" (resulting in the nickname "Operation Icebox"), they were subsequently divided into a research group and a group who assisted with V-2 test launches at White Sands Proving Grounds. German families began arriving in December 1946, and by the spring of 1948, the number of German rocket specialists (nicknamed "Prisoners of Peace") in the US was 127. Fort Bliss rocket launches included firings of the Private missile at the Hueco Range in April 1945. In 1953, funding cuts caused the cancellation of work on the Hermes B2 ramjet work that had begun at Fort Bliss.

In late 1953 after troops had been trained at the Ft Bliss Guided Missile School, field-firing operations of the MGM-5 Corporal were underway at Red Canyon Range Camp, WSPG. In April 1950, the 1st Guided Missile Group named the Republic-Ford JB-2 the ARMY LOON.

Cold War

Fort Bliss trained thousands of U.S. Soldiers during the Cold War. As the United States gradually came to master the art of building and operating missiles, Fort Bliss and White Sands Missile Range became more and more important to the country, and were expanded accordingly. On 1 July 1957 the U.S. Army Air Defense Center was established at Fort Bliss. Located at this center, in addition to Center Headquarters, are the U.S. Army Air Defense School; Air Defense; the 6th Artillery Group (Air Defense); the 61st Ordnance Group; and other supporting elements. In 1957 Fort Bliss and its anti-aircraft personnel began using Nike Ajax, Nike Hercules, Hawk, Sprint, Chaparral, and Redeye missiles. Fort Bliss took on the important role of providing a large area for troops to conduct live fire exercises with the missiles.

Because of the large number of Army personnel enrolled in the air defense school, Fort Bliss saw two large rounds of construction in 1954 and 1958. The former was aimed at creating more barracks facilities, while the latter was aimed at building new classrooms, materials labs, a radar park, and a missile laboratory. Between 1953 and 1957 the Army also expanded McGregor Range in an effort to accommodate live fire exercises of the new missile systems. Throughout the Cold War Fort Bliss remained a premier site for testing anti-aircraft equipment.

Fort Bliss was used as the Desert Stage of the Ranger School training course to prepare Ranger School graduates for operations in the deserts of the Middle East. From 1983 to 1987, Fort Bliss was home to the Ranger School's newly formed 4th (Desert Ranger) Training Company. This unit was later expanded in 1987 to form the newly created Ranger Training Brigade's short-lived 7th Ranger Training Battalion, which was then transferred to the Dugway Proving Grounds in Utah. The deserts of Utah proved to be unsuitable so the 7th Ranger Training Battalion was returned to Fort Bliss from 1991 until the Ranger School's Desert Phase was discontinued in 1995.

While the United States Army Air Defense Artillery School develops doctrine and tactics, training current and future soldiers has always been its core mission. Until 1990 the post was used for Basic Training and Advanced Individual Training (AIT), under the 1/56 ADA Regiment and 2/56 ADA Regiment, part of 6th ADA. Before 1989, 1/56 had three basic training companies and two AIT batteries. After 1990, 1/56 dropped basic training, that mission assumed by Fort Sill. The unit now had four enlisted batteries for enlisted AIT, one battery for the Officer's Basic Course and Captain's Career Course (added in 2004) and one company that trained army truck drivers (MOS 88M).

Base realignment and closure
In 1995, the Department of Defense recommended that the U.S. 3rd Armored Cavalry Regiment be relocated to Fort Carson, Colorado. Efforts to consolidate units from another post with those units that remained at Fort Bliss were overruled by the Base Realignment and Closing Commission, leaving Fort Bliss without any armored vehicles. Units operating the US Army's MIM-104 Patriot Missile Defense System relocated to Fort Bliss during the 1990s. The Patriot system played an important role in the Persian Gulf War/Operation Desert Storm in 1991. In commemoration, the US 54 expressway in northeast El Paso was designated the Patriot Freeway.

War on terror
After the September 11, 2001 attacks, Fort Bliss provided ADA Battalions for US and NATO use in Afghanistan and Iraq, and has served as one of the major deployment centers for troops bound for Iraq and Afghanistan. This mission is accomplished via nearby Biggs Army Airfield, which is included in the installation's supporting areas. Following the War in Afghanistan (2001–present) in 2001 Fort Bliss began training Afghan security forces at the U.S. Army Sergeants Major Academy at Fort Bliss, with the hope that these newly trained soldiers would eventually be able to take control of their own national security.

Base Realignment and Closure, 2005

In 2005, the Pentagon recommended transforming Fort Bliss into a heavy armor training post, to include approximately 11,500 new troops from the U.S. 1st Armored Division – at that time stationed in Germany – as well as units from Fort Sill and Fort Hood. An estimated 15,918 military jobs and 384 civilian jobs were planned to be transferred to Fort Bliss, brought the total number of troops stationed at Fort Bliss under this alignment to a total of 33,500 by 2012. Officials from Fort Bliss and the City of El Paso were thrilled with the decision; the general mood of the city government was perfectly captured by 14 May edition of the El Paso Times, which boldly proclaimed "BLISS WINS BIG".

According to Senator Eliot Shapleigh, the BRAC commission considered three primary factors to make its decision: The military value of Fort Bliss, the potential for other branches of the armed service to use a post as large as Fort Bliss, and the lack of urban encroachment around Fort Bliss that would otherwise hinder its growth. The arrival of the 11,500 troops from the 1st Armored Division is also expected to create some 20,196 direct and indirect military and civilian jobs in El Paso. According to the Department of Defense, this is the largest net gain in the United States tied to the Base Realignment and Closure recommendations. Of the 20,196 new jobs expected to come to El Paso as a result of Bliss' realignment 9,000 would be indirect civilian jobs created by the influx of soldiers to the "Sun City". When the BRAC commission recommendations were released Senator Kay Bailey Hutchison's spokesman reported that El Paso was the only area that came out with a major gain of forces.

The news that El Paso had been selected to receive major elements of the 1st Armored Division was met with joy, but at the same time many expressed surprise at the panel's recommendation to transfer the Air Defense Artillery School, 6th ADA Brigade, and its accompanying equipment (including the MIM-104 Patriot Missile Anti-Aircraft/Anti Missile defense system) to Fort Sill. On 25 August officials representing Fort Bliss went before the BRAC Commission to plead their case for maintaining the ADA school and its accompanying equipment at Fort Bliss, citing among other thing the size of Fort Bliss and the history of the ADA school in the region. The BRAC Commission ultimately ruled against Fort Bliss, and the roughly 4,500 affected soldiers were transferred to Fort Sill, Oklahoma. The entire transfer of soldiers to and from Fort Bliss was completed no later than 15 September 2011.

On 25 June 2009, authority over the post was shifted from Training and Doctrine Command to Forces Command.

Description
Among Fort Bliss' missions:
Home of America's Tank Division, 1st AD (One of 10 active divisions in the Army)
Largest Joint Mobilization Force Generation Installation (JMFGI) in DoD (FY19: over 72K): 49K MOB/DeMOB/CRC; 23K Pre Mobilization Exercise Training (PMET)
One of the largest Power Projection Platforms in the Army
Home to the Army's ONLY CONUS Replacement Center (CRC)
Interagency operations: El Paso Intelligence Center (EPIC), Joint Task Force North (JTF-N), Department of Homeland Security (DHS)
Joint Modernization Command (JMC)(Futures Command) conducts Joint Warfighter Assessments/Enhance Multi-Domain C2/Informs Army Modernization
Ability to fire any weapon (pistol to missile)
Provide anti-aircraft and missile defense capabilities.
Conduct live fire exercises of nearly every type of Army weapon.
Host joint military exercises with other U.S. and foreign units,
Be home to many maintenance crews and supply units.
Be one of the Army's premier bases for test-driving tanks and other equipment.
House thousands of military vehicles, including all the equipment needed to set up Patriot missile sites.
Hosted the USAADCEN Air Defense Artillery Center from 1942 to 2010. USAADCEN has completed its transfer to Fort Sill. Concomitantly, the German Air Force Air Defense school is going to move to new training facilities in Germany and Greece. In 2013, the German Air Force deactivated its presence at Fort Bliss, while retaining a presence at Holloman Air Force Base; over the previous 47 years, over 50,000 German Airmen received training at this command. In 2015, due to funding constraints on the planned new facilities in Europe, the German Air Force Air Defense school will stay open at Fort Bliss until 2020.
Host the CONUS Replacement Center (CRC), the unit-level training site for Soldiers, Sailors, and Airmen who are deploying or re-deploying on an individual basis. This CRC consolidates several other centers and now serves the entire Continental United States (CONUS).
A secured drone airfield, with a separate 5000 foot runway and dedicated hangar, 20–25 miles north of the main post is under construction, with completion expected by 2016. It will host a company of 9 MQ-1C Gray Eagles for First Armored Division.
Most of Fort Bliss lies in the state of New Mexico, stretching northeastward along U.S. Route 54 from El Paso County, Texas to the southern boundary of the Lincoln National Forest in Otero County, New Mexico; in addition, much of the northwestward side of Highway 54 is part of the Fort Bliss Military Reservation, ranging from the northern side of Chaparral, New Mexico to the southern boundary of White Sands Missile Range; the main facilities are within the city limits of El Paso, Texas. According to the city zoning map, the post officially resides in Central El Paso.

Fort Bliss K-12 Schools
Bliss Elementary
Logan Elementary
Milam Elementary
Colin Powell Elementary
Chapin High

Separate from the main post are the William Beaumont Army Medical Center (which also serves the warrior transition battalion for the post's wounded warriors) and a Department of Veterans Affairs center at the eastern base of the Franklin Mountains. All of these supporting missions serve the military and retired-military population here, including having served General of the Army Omar N. Bradley in his last days. A new warrior transition complex, located at Marshall and Cassidy roads, was opened in June 2011 to replace the older facility serving the warrior transition battalion. A new location for William Beaumont Army Medical Center, to be located at Spur 601 and Loop 375, is now rescheduled to be completed in September 2019.

The installation is also close to the El Paso Airport (with easy access from the post via Buffalo Soldier Road), Highway 54, and Interstate 10. There is a replica of the Magoffinsville site for Fort Bliss on post, simulating the adobe style of construction. Other items of interest include the Buffalo Soldier memorial statue at the Buffalo Soldier Gate of entry to the post, and a missile museum on Pleasanton Road.

The walls of the old Fort Bliss Officers Club contain adobe bricks that are more than a century old. The building houses a Family Readiness Group, where new personnel can learn about the post's activities and support groups. The Fort Bliss Welcome center, for new arrivals, is nearby, in the Building 500 area.

Fort Bliss has been designated a "No Drone Zone" by the FAA, out to 400 feet beyond the lateral edges of the military reservation. This is enforced by the Military Police. Counter-UAS training is available on-post.

Local impact

Fort Bliss is the single largest employer in the area supporting a total of 167,358 people with an estimated annual contribution of approximately 25.6 billion.

Fort Bliss is located among a population of more than 2.5M ("Three States, Two Nations").

Fort Bliss has assisted El Paso during local disasters. In 1897, and again in 1925, the fort provided food and housing to those displaced by flood waters. In 2006, Fort Bliss dispatched soldiers and helicopters to the flood-affected areas to help with rescue efforts there. The flooding of El Paso in 2013 and 2014 were not met with this type of official response.

As of July 2010, electric power consumption at Fort Bliss had been reduced by three megawatts as the base continues to work towards becoming a "net zero" energy installation. In April 2013, Major General Dana J.H. Pittard, USA, announced a $120 million project to be completed by 2015, consisting of the largest solar farm within the U.S. military.

A joint study by Fort Bliss and El Paso-area city governments found that desalination was a viable method for increasing El Paso's water supply by 25%. The Kay Bailey Hutchison Desalination Plant, on Montana Avenue, is located on Fort Bliss property, and desalinates the groundwater of the Hueco Bolson for use by El Paso and Fort Bliss. This reverse-osmosis plant protects the fresh groundwater supplies from invasion by more brackish water. This plant is currently the largest non-seawater desalination plant in the world.

In 2010, with the assumption of command by Major General Dana J.H. Pittard, a local that grew up in El Paso, Fort Bliss was made an "open post" which allowed anyone with a valid driver's license to enter the post. As of 2015 Fort Bliss is no longer an open post.
In 2020, 1st Armored Division's Operations Research and Systems Analysis officer (ORSA) created a COVID-19 progression rate model for the division; this model was also used by the COVID-19 task force for the City of El Paso.

Fort Bliss archaeologists manage 20,000 sites on the 1.12 million acre reservation, and serve as tribal liaison to seven federally-funded Indian tribes. The Hueco Tanks historic site in El Paso county is adjacent to the military reservation. Cultural liaison with the tribes at the sacred sites of the reservation is an annual event.

Geography

According to the United States Census Bureau, the census-designated place has a total area of 6.2 square miles (16.0 km2), all of it land. In terms of its United States physiographic region, it is a southern part of the Basin and Range Province.

Bunker 11507
An investigation into above-ground dirt-covered bunkers located on the military reservation was opened in June 2013. These former nuclear weapons bunkers were used by the Air Force during the Cold War, when Biggs Air Force Base was a SAC base. Low level radiation was detected in Bunker 11507. The bunker interiors were previously painted with epoxy paint to contain the radiation, and the paint has now chipped. The radiation contamination is confined to the area around the bunker. The area was closed on 11 July 2013.

Demographics
As of the census of 2000, there were 8,264 people, 1,527 households, and 1,444 families residing on the post. The population density was 1,340.1 people per square mile (517.1/km2). There were 2,309 housing units at an average density of 374.4/sq mi (144.5/km2). The racial makeup of the post was 58.1% White, 25.1% African American, 2.4% Asian, 1.3% Native American, 0.7% Pacific Islander, 8.9% from other races, and 3.5% from two or more races. Hispanic or Latino of any race were 19.3% of the population.

There were 1,527 households, out of which 80.0% had children under the age of 18 living with them, 84.5% were married couples living together, 8.2% had a female householder with no husband present, and 5.4% were non-families. 4.9% of all households were made up of individuals, and none had someone living alone who was 65 years of age or older. The average household size was 3.54 and the average family size was 3.62.

On the post the population was spread out, with 29.3% under the age of 18, 33.6% from 18 to 24, 34.7% from 25 to 44, 2.3% from 45 to 64, and 0.1% who were 65 years of age or older. The median age was 22 years. For every 100 females, there were 167.0 males. For every 100 females age 18 and over, there were 204.8 males.

The median income for a household on the post was $35,970, and the median income for a family was $34,679. Males had a median income of $19,920 versus $17,227 for females. The per capita income for the post was $13,201. About 9.5% of families and 11.0% of the population were below the poverty line, including 12.5% of those under age 18 and none of those age 65 or over.

Education

Fort Bliss is within the El Paso Independent School District.

Bliss Elementary School is inside Fort Bliss, serving family housing areas on the main post. Milam Elementary School is in the Aero Vista development on Fort Bliss. Residents zoned to Bliss Elementary are zoned to Bassett Middle School and Captain John L. Chapin High School. Residents zoned to Milam are zoned to Ross Middle School and Austin High School.

The Bundeswehr maintains a school for German national children at Fort Bliss. The grade 1–12 school was established circa 1976, and as of 2016 had 55 students.

Museums and historic preservation

The Replica Museum is located next to the Noel Parade Field and depicts the Post at the Magoffinsville site. This five building museum was authentically constructed with adobe bricks and painted stucco, and includes a sutler store, bunkhouse, blacksmith shop, saddlery, and a pottery kiln. The museum depicts the story of Fort Bliss and El Paso from 1848 to 1948 and was dedicated on the 100th anniversary.

The Fort Bliss and Ironsides Museums are located next to the Athletic Field and includes outdoor and indoor exhibits. These include important historical artifacts from the founding of Fort Bliss to the present day, such as General Pershing's Dodge Command Car and a Patriot Missile.

The Fort Bliss Main Post Historic District, a large historic district including 343 buildings deemed to be contributing, was listed on the National Register of Historic Places in 1998.

See also

List of World War II prisoner-of-war camps in the United States
El Paso metropolitan area
Transformation of the United States Army#Divisions and Brigades
2015 Fort Bliss shooting
24th Press Camp Headquarters

References

External links

EPCC library guides Borderlands
Official website
Fort Bliss Morale, Welfare and Recreation Program website
Fort Bliss Monitor, the post newspaper was renamed The Fort Bliss Bugle; there is also a Fort Bliss Facebook page
Colonel Augustine D. Dugan Memorial

American Civil War forts
Census-designated places in Texas
Buildings and structures in Doña Ana County, New Mexico
Buildings and structures in El Paso County, Texas
Buildings and structures in Otero County, New Mexico
Forts in New Mexico
Forts in Texas
Installations of the German Air Force
United States Army posts
Training installations of the United States Army
1849 establishments in Texas
Military installations established in 1849